Edithais is an extinct genus of sea snails, marine gastropod mollusks, in the family Muricidae, the murex snails or rock snails.

Species
Species within the genus Edithais include:
 † Edithais pehuensis (Marwick, 1926)

References

 
Gastropods described in 1998
Monotypic gastropod genera